The following is a list of currently operating hospitals in Northern Ireland.

County Antrim

Belfast
Belfast City Hospital
Knockbracken Healthcare Park
Mater Infirmorum Hospital
Musgrave Park Hospital
Royal Belfast Hospital for Sick Children
Royal Jubilee Maternity Hospital
Royal Victoria Hospital
Lagan Valley Hospital

Others
Antrim Area Hospital, Antrim
Braid Valley Care Complex, Ballymena
Dalriada Hospital, Ballycastle
Holywell Hospital, Antrim
Lagan Valley Hospital, Lisburn
Moyle Hospital, Larne
Muckamore Abbey Hospital
Robinson Hospital, Ballymoney
Whiteabbey Hospital, Newtownabbey

Former
Belvoir Park Hospital, Belfast
Shaftesbury Square Hospital, Belfast
Forster Green Hospital, Belfast

County Armagh
Armagh Community Hospital, Armagh
Craigavon Area Hospital, Portadown
Lurgan Hospital, Lurgan
St Luke's Hospital, Armagh
Daisy Hill Hospital, Newry

County Down
Ards Community Hospital, Newtownards
Bangor Community Hospital, Bangor
Downe Hospital, Downpatrick
Ulster Hospital, Dundonald

Former
Banbridge Hospital

County Fermanagh
South West Acute Hospital, Enniskillen

Former
Erne Hospital, Enniskillen

County Londonderry

Derry
Altnagelvin Area Hospital
Grangewood Hospital
Lakeview Hospital
Waterside Hospital

Other
Causeway Hospital, Coleraine
Mid-Ulster Hospital, Magherafelt

Former
Gransha Hospital
Roe Valley Hospital, Limavady

County Tyrone (Non-Acute)
Omagh Hospital and Primary Care Complex, Omagh
South Tyrone Hospital, Dungannon
Tyrone and Fermanagh Hospital, Omagh

Former
Tyrone County Hospital

Non-NHS hospitals in Northern Ireland
Fitzwilliam Clinic, Belfast
Hillsborough Clinic, Hillsborough
Kingsbridge Private Hospital, Belfast
Kingsbridge Private Hospital North West, Ballykelly
Ulster Independent Clinic, Belfast

Northern Ireland
 
Hospitals